Zaks is a surname. Among Jews, it can be a variant of the German surname, Sachs, the patronymic variant of the Hebrew biblical male personal name Yitzchak/Isaac or it can originate in the acronym surname Za'Ks, which stands for the Hebrew words, Zera Kodesh Shemo, literally meaning "his name is Holy Seed," a quotation from Isaiah 6:13 and implying "his name descends from martyrs." This acronym can also refer to the town of martyrdom, such as Speyer or Stendal, indicating a holy martyr from such a town. Notable people with the surname include:

Amram Zaks (1926–2012), Israeli Rosh yeshiva
Hillel Zaks (-2015), Israeli Rosh yeshiva
Jerry Zaks (born 1946), German actor
Mendel Zaks (1898–1974), American rabbi
Rodnay Zaks (born 1946), American author
Shmuel Zaks (born 1949), Israeli scientist

See also 

Gordon Zacks
Sachs
Sacks (surname)
Saks (disambiguation)
Sax (disambiguation)
Saxe (disambiguation)
Zaks (disambiguation)
Zax (disambiguation)

References

Jewish surnames